Jason Berthomier (born 6 January 1990) is a French professional footballer who plays as a midfielder for Ligue 2 club Valenciennes.

Career
Berthomier began his career at hometown club Montluçon in 2008 before dropping into regional football with AS Domerat during the 2009–10 season. He subsequently spent four seasons with Moulins of the Championnat de France amateur, where he scored 31 goals in 110 league matches, before joining Bourg-Péronnas in the summer of 2014. In his first season with the club he was a regular starter as the team won promotion to Ligue 2, the second highest division of French football, for the first time in their history.

External links
 
 
 Jason Berthomier at foot-national.com
 

1990 births
Living people
People from Montluçon
Sportspeople from Allier
French footballers
Footballers from Auvergne-Rhône-Alpes
Association football midfielders
Ligue 1 players
Ligue 2 players
Championnat National players
Montluçon Football players
AS Moulins players
Football Bourg-en-Bresse Péronnas 01 players
Stade Brestois 29 players
ES Troyes AC players
Clermont Foot players
Valenciennes FC players